INS Nipat (K86) was a  of the Indian Navy. It was part of the 25th "Killer" Missile squadron.

Operation Trident
During the Indo-Pakistani War of 1971, INS Nipat was part of the Operation Trident strike force. On the afternoon of 4 December, the strike group made its way towards Karachi. Late that evening, around 70 miles south of Karachi, the Nipat detected a large target about 42 miles to the northeast, later identified as the merchant vessel, MV Venus Challenger, chartered by the Pakistan Navy to carry US ammunition to East Pakistan. It had Pakistani naval officers and sailors on board. The Nipat launched 2 missiles on MV Venus Challenger, sinking it.

Other vessels of the strike group sank a Pakistan Navy destroyer  and a minesweeper PNS Muhafiz.

Lieutenant Commander Bahadur Nariman Kavina, the Commanding Officer of the Nipat was awarded the Vir Chakra for his role during the operation.

References

Vidyut-class missile boats
Fast attack craft of the Indian Navy

Naval ships of India
December 1971 events in Asia
Naval battles of Indo-Pakistani wars